Sir John Maxwell, 8th Baronet, FRSE (12 May 1791 – 6 June 1865) was a Scottish landowner and politician.

Life

Maxwell was born at Pollok House, Renfrewshire on 12 May 1791 the son of Hannah Anne Gardiner and her husband, Sir John Maxwell, 7th Baronet. He was educated at Westminster School in London. He then studied at the University of Oxford and the University of Edinburgh.

Later he represented , between the years of 1832 and 1837.

He succeeded to the baronetcy in 1844 on the death of his father.

In 1854 he was elected a Fellow of the Royal Society of Edinburgh his proposer being Thomas Makdougall Brisbane.

He was influential in the restoration of Haggs Castle in 1860.

In 1864 he was one of the main funders behind a new church in Glasgow which was later known as the Maxwell Church.

Family

In 1839 he married Lady Matilda Harriet Bruce (d. 1857). They did not have children.

References

Members of the Parliament of the United Kingdom for Scottish constituencies
1791 births
1865 deaths
Politics of Renfrewshire
Politics of Lanarkshire
Place of birth missing
John, 8
Alumni of the University of Edinburgh
Alumni of the University of Oxford
Baronets in the Baronetage of Nova Scotia
UK MPs 1818–1820
UK MPs 1820–1826
UK MPs 1826–1830
UK MPs 1832–1835
UK MPs 1835–1837